Ten Thousand Miles in the Southern Cross is a 1922 New Zealand travelogue made by George Tarr during a 1922 voyage in the South Pacific. Most are of indigenous tribes e.g. ritual dances, though one shot is of a bishop in full canonical regalia, presumably at a Melanesian mission. Most of the shots are wide shots, with less than 10% close-ups, including one of a small child smoking a cigarette with tears running down his cheeks.

Originally thought lost, 16 minutes of the film were found in Australia in 1995. This part was shot in the Solomon Islands and four other Melanesian locations. On a poster the title is “10,000 miles in the S.Y. Southern Cross” (S.Y. presumably for Steam Yacht), and says “A wonderful trip to the sea girt islands of the Western Pacific”.  Sam Edwards says “Tarr’s images leave the viewer with a satisfying sense both of freshness and enlightenment”.

References
New Zealand Film 1912-1996 by Helen Martin & Sam Edwards p31 (1997, Oxford University Press, Auckland)

External links
 1922 newspaper article on showing of film

1922 films
New Zealand documentary films
Films set in Oceania
1922 documentary films
Black-and-white documentary films
Films set in the 1920s
Films shot in the Solomon Islands
Films based on New Zealand novels
New Zealand silent films
Documentary films about Oceania
Travelogues
1920s English-language films